Shinonome may refer to:

Places
Shinonome, Tokyo (東雲), an area in Koto Ward, Tokyo

Transport and vehicles

Rail
Shinonome Station (disambiguation), 東雲駅 Shinonome-eki, several Japanese train stations
Shinonome Station (Kyoto) (東雲駅 Shinonome-eki), a train station in Kyoto, Japan
Shinonome Station (Tokyo) (東雲駅 Shinonome-eki), a train station in Tokyo, Japan

Naval
Japanese destroyer Shinonome
 Japanese destroyer Shinonome (1898) (東雲), a Murakumo-class destroyer of the Imperial Japanese Navy during the Russo-Japanese War
 Shinonome-class destroyer (東雲型駆逐艦 Shinonomegata kuchikukan), an alternate name for the Murakumo destroyer class 
 Japanese destroyer Shinonome (1927) (東雲), a Fubuki-class destroyer built for the Imperial Japanese Navy following World War I.

People with the surname
Mizuo Shinonome (東雲 水生), a Japanese manga artist

Fictional
Hitomi Shinonome, a character in Loveless
Various members of the Shinonome family, characters in Eiken
Satsuki Shinonome and Hazuki Shinonome, characters in Love, Elections & Chocolate
Kon Shinonome, a character in Amatsuki
 Nano Shinonome, Professor Shinonome and Principal Shinonome, characters in Nichijou
 Shinonome, Northern Troupe Leader in the manga Adekan
 Shinonome, dragon sister to the Eliatrope Qilby, characters in Wakfu
Ena Shinonome, a character in Hatsune Miku: Colorful Stage!
Akito Shinonome, a character in Hatsune Miku: Colorful Stage!

Other
Shinonome, a raster font family from which Mona Font is derived